1811 Kid Ory Historic House is a museum in LaPlace, Louisiana, housed in a historic plantation house formerly known by names including Andry Plantation and Woodland Plantation. It focuses on the 1811 German Coast uprising, which Charles Deslondes started there, and the life of jazz pioneer Kid Ory, born here in 1886.   Other exhibits include antique phonographs and history of plantation life.

References
1811 Kid Ory Historic House Official website
At 1811 Kid Ory Historic House in St. John, a slave revolt was born, and a musician grew up NOLA.com article 17 August 2021
Former Woodland Plantation now serves as the 1811 Kid Ory Historic House March 2021, Preservation in Print
Kid Ory Finally Gets the Encore He Deserves Smithsonian, January 2021
How a museum founder battled Ida to save precious pieces of the history of Louisiana's enslaved people CNN, 31 August 2021

External links

1811 Kid Ory Historic House Official website

Museums in St. John the Baptist Parish, Louisiana
National Historic Landmarks in Louisiana
Louisiana African American Heritage Trail
Historic house museums in Louisiana
Houses in St. John the Baptist Parish, Louisiana
Plantation houses in Louisiana